Henry Edward Ernest Victor Bliss, 4th Baron Bliss, commonly known as Baron Bliss (16 February 1869 – 9 March 1926), was a British-born traveller who willed nearly two million Belize dollars to a trust fund for the benefit of the citizens of what was then the colony of British Honduras, now Belize.

Biography
He was born Henry Edward Ernest Victor de Barreto and lived in Marlow, Buckinghamshire, England, as a youth. His father was Henry Aldridge, who inherited the estate of his uncle Edward Bliss of Brandon, Suffolk, a manufacturer of flintlock mechanisms for guns, and changed his surname to Bliss under the terms of his uncle's will. In 1855, Henry Bliss inherited the estate and title of his cousin the Baron de Alreyo of the Kingdom of Portugal, although he was styled the Baron de Bliss due to the conditions stated in his uncle's will. In June 1869, he was granted another bequest from Colonel Carlo Antonio Barreto of the Kingdom of Spain, with the stipulation that he change his name to Barreto, and he did so in spite of the earlier limitation from his uncle.

Henry Edward Ernest Victor de Barreto was an engineer by trade and on the death of his father in 1890, became the 4th Baron de Barreto. However during the First World War he reverted to his family name of Bliss, and was known afterwards as Baron Bliss. He was apparently successful in his career, but it is not known how he obtained his fortune, whether due to business acumen or inheritance, or a combination thereof.

Bliss became paralysed from the waist down in 1911 at the age of 42, likely due to polio, and was confined to a wheelchair. Despite this, he remained active. He was apparently an avid sailor, but had his yacht confiscated for war purposes during the First World War. When the war ended, he was wealthy enough to retire to a lifetime of fishing and leisure, so to that end he ordered a new 120 ft twin screw yacht from the famous Scottish yacht designer Alfred Mylne, which he christened Sea King II. In 1920, he sailed the yacht to the Bahamas, where he stayed for five years. Meanwhile, his wife Baroness Ethel Alice Bliss stayed in England, living off a portion of his fortune. The couple had no children.

Although he had some property there, he eventually grew tired of Bahamanian society and decided to move on. Leaving the Bahamas behind, he sailed to Trinidad and was there for a short while when he came down with a serious bout of food poisoning. Deciding to accept a previous invitation from his friend Willoughby Bullock, who was then Attorney General of British Honduras, he sailed westward, stopping briefly in Jamaica likely for medical attention, and arriving in the Belize City harbour on  1926.

Bliss's health appeared to improve over the next few weeks, and he spent much of this time sailing around the area in his launch, exploring the coastline and fishing. However, just days before his 57th birthday, his health took a turn for the worse, and doctors advised him that he was terminally ill. It was at this time that he decided he would leave the bulk of his fortune to the country, and signed a new draft of his will, dated . Several weeks later, he died on his yacht, never having landed on the Belize mainland. He was buried in the former site of a Spanish fortress which was extremely damaged after the Battle of St. George's Caye in September 1798 in Belize City, what is now known as Bliss Park. This was a temporary arrangement, and he was later interred in a granite tomb near the sea, with a lighthouse nearby, built with funds from his estate. The burial instructions were explicitly stated in the will.

The Bliss bequest
About $480,000 was claimed by the United Kingdom in inheritance taxes. His will gave specific instructions on how the money was to be used to the benefit of the citizens of British Honduras. Aside from small lifetime annuities to his wife and relatives in England and to his personal staff, the remainder of the funds was placed in a trust, executed by the Governor, the Colonial Secretary, and the Attorney General.

The original money was to be invested in British stocks and securities, and only the interest earned could be spent, and even that could not be spent on churches, dance halls or schools, except agricultural and vocational ones. One-hundred pounds sterling was to be set aside annually for a regatta, which has since been held every year on Baron Bliss Day. A peculiar condition attached to the money was that no American may be a trustee or an employee of a trustee. No explanation was given.

National Heroes and Benefactors Day
Soon after his death, the government declared  to be Baron Bliss Day, a national public holiday. In 2019, it was celebrated on Monday, 11 March. In 2023, the holiday is set to be observed on Monday, March 6.

References

Bliss, Baron Henry
Bliss, Baron Henry
British philanthropists
British emigrants to Belize